In probability theory, the law of rare events or Poisson limit theorem states that the Poisson distribution may be used as an approximation to the binomial distribution, under certain conditions. The theorem was named after Siméon Denis Poisson (1781–1840). A generalization of this theorem is Le Cam's theorem.

Theorem
Let  be a sequence of real numbers in  such that the sequence  converges to a finite limit . Then:

Proofs
 .

Since

and

This leaves

Alternative proof
Using Stirling's approximation, it can be written:

Letting  and :

As ,  so:

Ordinary generating functions
It is also possible to demonstrate the theorem through the use of ordinary generating functions of the binomial distribution:

by virtue of the binomial theorem. Taking the limit  while keeping the product  constant, it can be seen:

which is the OGF for the Poisson distribution. (The second equality holds due to the definition of the exponential function.)

See also
De Moivre–Laplace theorem
Le Cam's theorem

References

Articles containing proofs
Probability theorems